Majosi Sport Egyesület is a professional football club based in Bonyhád, Hungary, that competes in the Nemzeti Bajnokság III, the third tier of Hungarian football.

Honours

Domestic

Season results
As of 15 April 2022

External links
 Profile on Magyar Futball

References

Football clubs in Hungary
Association football clubs established in 1964
1964 establishments in Hungary